BA School of Business and Finance is one of the leading, self-financing business schools in Latvia. It was founded in 1992 as a Banking College under the Bank of Latvia and received accreditation in 1997

In 2007 BA School of Business and Finance celebrated its 15th anniversary. It supports United Nations initiative and follows the Principles for Responsible Management Education. On December 11 BA School of Business and Finance announced its decision to achieve Investors in Excellence Standard (a national standard which is based on the concepts of Excellence and the nine criteria of the widely used European Excellence Model (EFQM)).

Today it offers undergraduate, graduate and post-graduate programmes in Economics and Entrepreneurship, Business Administration and Finance. The study processes have gained an explicit international dimension. Graduates are nationally and internationally recognized entrepreneurs, managers, consultants, experts and professionals.

Studies 
The school offers the following study programmes:

First level professional education programmes
 Entrepreneurship
 Banking Operations
 Accountancy and Finance

Bachelor's degree study programmes
 Business administration
 Finance
 Risk management and Insurance
 Innovation and Product Development in Business

Master's degree study programmes
 Business Administration
 Finance
 International finance and Banking (double degree programme with the Swiss Business School based in Zürich)
 Creative Industries Management
 Innovative Entrepreneurship
 Financial Management
 Cybersecurity ManagementDoctor's study programme (3 years)'''
 Joint Doctoral Programme in Business Administration

Membership in international organizations 
 Network of International Business Schools
 Professional Inter-University Management for Educational Networking
 European Association of Institutions in Higher Education
 Baltic Management Development Association
 Central and East European Management Development Association
 European Network for Business Studies and Languages
 European Foundation for Management Development
 Midlands Excellence/Investor in Excellence

References

Business schools in Latvia
Education in Riga
Educational institutions established in 1992
1992 establishments in Latvia